Centaur Press, later renamed Centaur Books, was a New York-based small publisher active from the late 1960s through 1981. The press was founded by Charles M. Collins and Donald M. Grant.   It was primarily a paperback publisher, though one of its more successful titles was reissued in hardcover. It was notable for reviving pulp adventure and fantasy works of the early twentieth century for its "Time-Lost Series."

Authors whose works were returned to print by Centaur Press include Robert E. Howard, Arthur O. Friel, J. Allan Dunn, Alfred H. Bill, Jean d'Esme, Darrel Crombie, Arthur D. Howden Smith, Talbot Mundy, E. Charles Vivian, Will Garth, H. Warner Munn, and William Hope Hodgson. In the sole anthology it issued, the press also premiered a couple new works, one by Crombie and one by contemporary author Lin Carter. In later years it also published longer works by contemporary authors, including Carter, Galad Elflandsson, and Robb Walsh. Its books featured cover art by Jeff Jones, Robert Bruce Acheson, Virgil Finlay, Frank Brunner, David Ireland, Stephen Fabian, Randy Broecker, and David Wenzel.

Centaur's output was small, generally on the order of one to three books a year. Its publications featured thicker and less acidic paper than that utilized by most paperback houses.

Bibliography of books published
Asterisked titles were issued in the publisher's "Time-Lost" series.

The Moon of Skulls* (Solomon Kane Vol. 1), by Robert E. Howard, Nov. 1969.
The Pathless Trail*, by Arthur O. Friel, Nov. 1969.
The Hand of Kane* (Solomon Kane Vol. 2), by Robert E. Howard, Oct. 1970.
The Treasure of Atlantis*, by J. Allan Dunn, Oct 1970, hardcover Sep. 1971 (limited ed.).
Solomon Kane* (Solomon Kane Vol. 3), by Robert E. Howard, Feb. 1971.
Tiger River*, by Arthur O. Friel, May 1971.
Swordsmen and Supermen* (anthology), Feb. 1972.
The Wolf in the Garden, by Alfred H. Bill, 1972.
Caesar Dies*, by Talbot Mundy, Nov. 1973.
The City of Wonder*, by E. Charles Vivian, Nov. 1973.
Grey Maiden: The Story of a Sword Through the Ages*, by Arthur D. Howden Smith, Oct. 1974.
Dr. Cyclops*, by Will Garth, 1976.
The Werewolf of Ponkert*, by H. Warner Munn, 1976.
The World of Tolkien Illustrated, by Lin Carter, 1978.
The Black Wolf, by Galad Elflandsson, 1980.
Out of the Storm, by William Hope Hodgson, 1980.
Kingdom of the Dwarfs, by Robb Walsh, 1980.

General references
ISFDB entry for Centaur Press
ISFDB entry for Centaur Books

Publishing companies established in 1969
Book publishing companies based in New York (state)
American companies established in 1969